PicPick is a Windows program used for creating and editing screenshots. After installation, it resides in the taskbar where all its functions can be accessed via the context menu. It can either be installed or can be run as a portable app.

License 
PicPick is free for private use. Commercial users must purchase a license.

The free version requires manual update and provides no technical support.

Functions

Creation of screenshots 
The creation of screenshots is possible in two ways: 
 Press the Print Screen button to automatically take a screenshot of the desktop or, in conjunction with the Alt key, the current window in PicPick opens. 
 Using the taskbar context menu multiple screenshot variations are possible. A scrolling window selection method can be used. This enables, for example, the capture of a full web page to a single screenshot.

Image editing 
In addition to the ability to take a screenshot, PicPick also provides basic editing functions.

Recent versions also allow the sharing of images via Facebook and Twitter, Email, Skype amongst others.

Supported formats 
Supported formats .bmp, .gif, .jpg, .png, .pdf.

Downloads 
Via cnet alone it had almost 2 million downloads.

See also 
 Screenshot software

References

External links 
 
 How to Share Images Online Using PicPick
 How to Take Great Screenshots with PicPick
 PicPickv4.1.3 review portablefreeware.com

Graphics software
Screenshot software
Freeware
Windows software